Antonio Ansola Arrieta (17 January 1931 – 2 December 2013) was a Spanish footballer who played as a defender.

He played 141 football games for Real Sociedad mostly during the 1950s. He would end his career at Elche CF, in the 1961–62 season, after which he retired.

External links
 
 Obituary at Realsociedad.com

1931 births
2013 deaths
People from Elgoibar
Spanish footballers
Footballers from the Basque Country (autonomous community)
Association football defenders
La Liga players
Real Sociedad footballers